This is a list of seasons completed by the Minnesota North Stars of the National Hockey League. This list documents the records and playoff results for all seasons the North Stars completed before they moved to Dallas after the 1992-93 season as the Dallas Stars. For records after 1993, see List of Dallas Stars seasons.

Note: GP = Games played, W = Wins, L = Losses, T = Ties, OTL = Overtime losses, Pts = Points, GF = Goals for, GA = Goals against

References

Minnesota North Stars seasons
Minnesota North Stars
seasons